The 2003 USL A-League was an American Division II league run by the United Soccer League during the summer of 2003.

League standings

Eastern Conference

Northeast Division

Southeast Division

Western Conference

Central Division

Pacific Division

Division finals

Northeast Division

The Rochester Rhinos advance 2 – 1 on aggregate.

Southeast Division

The Charleston Battery advance 4 – 2 on aggregate.

Central Division

The Minnesota Thunder advance 2 – 1 on aggregate.

Pacific Division

The Seattle Sounders advance 1 – 0 on aggregate.

Conference Finals

Eastern Conference final

The Charleston Battery advance 1 – 0 on aggregate.

Western Conference final

The Minnesota Thunder advance 2 – 0 on aggregate.

Final

Points leaders

Awards and All A-League Teams
All A-League First Team
F: Thiago Martins (Pittsburgh Riverhounds) (MVP & Leading Goalscorer); Doug Miller (Rochester Raging Rhinos); Dante Washington (Virginia Beach Mariners)
M: Roland Aguilera (Virginia Beach Mariners); Marco Ferruzzi (Minnesota Thunder); Andrew Gregor (Seattle Sounders); Ricardo Villar (Pittsburgh Riverhounds)
D: Gabriel Gervais (Montreal Impact) (Defender of the Year);  Danny Jackson (Seattle Sounders); John Wilson (Charleston Battery)
G: Greg Sutton (Montreal Impact) (Goalkeeper of the Year)
Coach: Bob Lilley Montreal Impact) (Coach of the Year)

All A-League Second Team
F: Byron Alvarez (Portland Timbers); Greg Howes (Milwaukee Wave United); Kevin Jeffrey (Richmond Kickers)
M: Ted Chronopoulos (Charleston Battery); Ollie Heald (Vancouver Whitecaps); Zé Roberto (Montreal Impact); David Testo (Richmond Kickers)
D: Scott Schweitzer (Rochester Raging Rhinos); Steve Shak (Minnesota Thunder); Alan Woods (Atlanta Silverbacks)
G: Rich Cullen (Seattle Sounders)

References

External links
United Soccer Leagues (RSSSF)
2003 A-League
The Year in American Soccer - 2003

2
2
2003